Matthew Fox (born 1966) is an American actor.

Matthew Fox may also refer to:

 Matt Fox (baseball) (born 1982), former baseball pitcher
 Matthew Fox (footballer) (born 1971), English football defender with Birmingham City and Northampton Town
 Matt Fox (musician) (born 1973), American musician and Shai Hulud guitarist
 Matthew Fox (priest) (born 1940), American Episcopalian (formerly Roman Catholic) priest and author
 Matt Fox (comics) (1906–1988), American illustrator and comic book artist
 Matthew Fox (author), Canadian author and magazine editor